Ovidio Bobîrnat (born 4 May 1978) is a Romanian and Cypriot boxer. He competed in the men's featherweight event at the 2000 Summer Olympics. Representing Cyprus, he won a silver medal in the 2005 Mediterranean Games in the featherweight category.

References

1978 births
Living people
Romanian male boxers
Cypriot male boxers
Olympic boxers of Romania
Boxers at the 2000 Summer Olympics
Competitors at the 2005 Mediterranean Games
Mediterranean Games silver medalists for Cyprus
Commonwealth Games competitors for Cyprus
Boxers at the 2006 Commonwealth Games
Sportspeople from Iași
Romanian emigrants to Cyprus
Mediterranean Games medalists in boxing
AIBA World Boxing Championships medalists
Featherweight boxers